Austrobasidium is a genus of fungi in the Exobasidiaceae family. The genus is monotypic and contains the single species Austrobasidium pehueldeni, found parasitizing the woody plant Hydrangea serratifolia in Chile.

References

External links
 

Ustilaginomycotina
Monotypic Basidiomycota genera
Fungi of South America